Kombu Vatcha Singamda is a 2022 Indian Tamil-language action drama film written and directed by S.R. Prabhakaran and produced by Redhan The Cinema People. The film stars M. Sasikumar and Madonna Sebastian with a supporting cast including Soori, Mahendran, Hareesh Peradi and Inder Kumar. The film's music and score is composed by Dhibu Ninan Thomas, with cinematography handled by N. K. Ekambaram and editing done by V. Don Bosco. The film released in theatres on 13 January 2022. The film received mixed reviews.

Cast 

 M. Sasikumar as Thaman
 Madonna Sebastian as Thamizhselvi 
 Soori as Karthik
 Mahendran as Deivendran 
 Hareesh Peradi as Vellappan 
 Inder Kumar
 Sri Priyanka as Ragini
 Dheepa Ramanujam 
 Kulappulli Leela as Ragini's grandmother
 Sathyapriya
 Aruldoss
 Sangili Murugan
 Gajaraj
 Hello Kandasamy
 Sendrayan as Thamizhselvi's lover
 Mu Ramaswamy as Village head
 Thamizhkumaran
 Ragaash
 Galatta Guru
 Raghav Vijay
Abi Saravanan as Thaman's friend
 Santhosh Krishnan
 Logu
 Rishi Prakash as story listener 
 Munnar Ramesh as Goon
 Nagavishal
 Samuthirakani as an Eelam fighter (Special appearance)

Production
The film marked M. Sasikumar's second collaboration with S. R. Prabhakaran after Sundarapandian (2012). The cast was finalized with Madonna Sebastian playing the female lead opposite Sasikumar. The principal photography began with a pooja ceremony on 13 October 2020. The film was shot in Karaikudi, Coimbatore, Pollachi, Palani, Tenkasi, Kovilpatti, Virudhunagar and Madurai cities and was wrapped up in a single schedule in May 2021.

Soundtrack 
The soundtrack and score is composed by Dhibu Ninan Thomas and the album featured four songs.

Release 
The trailer of the film was released in September 2021. The film released in theatres on 13 January 2022.

Home Media
The Satellite Rights bagged by Sun TV. The streaming rights acquired by Sun NXT and Netflix.

Reception 
The film released worldwide 13 January 2022.Logesh Balachandran critic of Times of india gave 2.5 stars out of 5 stars and noted that " The twist in the climax sequence and the veteran director's performance is one of the highlights of this movie."Cinema Express  Critic Avinash Ramachandran said "  Kombu Vatcha Singamda is definitely no Pariyerum Perumal or Karnan or Kaala, but it is definitely a couple of rungs higher than Sundarapandian, and it just goes on to show that the long write-ups, the deep analysis, and well-intentioned criticisms are reaching the right places, and the change is happening. Slowly.but steadily." and gave 2.5 stars out of 5 stars.Maalai Malar critic noted that " SR Prabhakaran has directed the film. He has directed the film with the features of a commercial film. But, it did not attract the fans in a big way."

References

External links
 

2020s Tamil-language films
2022 films